Admiral Volodymyr Bezkorovainy; August 16, 1944 — January 23, 2017) was the former Commander of the Ukrainian Navy (October 1993 – October 1996).

References

External links
 Biography (In Ukrainian)
 Biography (In Russian)
 

1944 births
2017 deaths
Ukrainian admirals
People from Uman